Bradford Burgess (born April 29, 1990) is an American professional basketball player who last played for Liège Basket of the Pro Basketball League. Born in Midlothian, Virginia, Burgess played four seasons for the VCU Rams team, from 2008 till 2012. His jersey number 20 was retired by the Rams.

Professional career
Burgess started his professional career in Belgium with the Stella Artois Leuven Bears. He played two seasons in Leuven.

In 2014, Brugess signed with Orlandina Basket of the Italian Lega Basket Serie A (LBA) and parted ways with them on March 25, 2015.

On August 26, 2015, Burgess signed for the UBC Magnofit Güssing Knights of the Austrian ÖBL.

On July 1, 2016, Burgess signed with Alba Fehérvár. With Alba, Burgess won the 2017 Hungarian Cup tournament.

On January 27, 2018, Burgess signed with Donar of the Dutch Basketball League (DBL), who acquired him as a replacement for Stephen Domingo who suffered a season-ending injury. With Donar, he won the 2017–18 DBL championship, as well did he advance to the semifinals of the FIBA Europe Cup.

He signed with Liège Basket of the Belgian league on August 14, 2018.  

The Oklahoma City Blue has named Bradford Burgess an assistant coach on Head Coach Grant Gibbs’ staff, the team announced in January 2021.

Burgess came to the Blue after spending the 2019-20 season as a performance analyst for the Oklahoma City Thunder. 

In 2021, Burgess was hired by the Chicago Bulls as a Player Development Coordinator.

References

1990 births
Living people
Alba Fehérvár players
American expatriate basketball people in Austria
American expatriate basketball people in Belgium
American expatriate basketball people in Hungary
American expatriate basketball people in Italy
American men's basketball players
Basketball players from Richmond, Virginia
Donar (basketball club) players
Dutch Basketball League players
Falco KC Szombathely players
Leuven Bears players
Liège Basket players
Orlandina Basket players
People from Midlothian, Virginia
Small forwards
VCU Rams men's basketball players